The Federal Archival Agency of the Russian Federation is the federal executive body subordinate to the President of Russia which is responsible for providing public services, management of federal property in the field of archives.

Duties
 Providing public services in the field of archives;
 Public accounting archives collections of the Russian Federation, of the State register of unique archives collections of the Russian Federation;
 Ensuring compliance with the rules of acquisition, storage, recording and use of archival documents.

References

External links
 Official site
 "Archivy Rossii" (Russia archives) portal

Archives in Russia